"Everybody's Sweetheart" is a song written and recorded by American country music artist Vince Gill.  It was released in January 1988 as the third single from the album The Way Back Home.  The song reached #11 on the Billboard Hot Country Singles & Tracks chart.

Content
The song is a comedic look at Gill's relationship with his then-wife Janis Gill, who at the time was one-half of the duo Sweethearts of the Rodeo. This duo also provided backing vocals on the corresponding album. In the book For the Music: The Vince Gill Story, Jo Sgammato describes the song as "an ode to being in love with someone who's famous and on the road."

Chart performance

References

1988 singles
1987 songs
Vince Gill songs
Songs written by Vince Gill
RCA Records singles
Song recordings produced by Richard Landis
Songs about musicians